The Saab 90 Scandia was a civil passenger aeroplane, manufactured by the Svenska Aeroplan Aktiebolaget (SAAB), in Linköping, Sweden. In 1944, as it was becoming clear that hostilities in Europe (the Second World War) would soon be at an end, SAAB realised that the company had to diversify from purely military endeavours if it were to survive. The board therefore decided to put into action a plan to manufacture a twin-engined, short- to medium-haul passenger aircraft, as a successor for the Douglas DC-3. (This was the same commercially driven stimulus that led to automobile production, with the Ursaab and subsequent Saab 92 passenger vehicles.)

The design of the 90 Scandia was quite similar to the DC-3. The most distinct visible difference was that the 90 had tricycle landing gear while the DC-3 had a tailwheel. The Scandia also had a quite different vertical stabilizer shape, and numerous more subtle differences. The 90 had to compete with the many surplus DC-3s available on the market at the same time, making sales difficult.

Design and development

Development started in February 1944. Takeoff weight was specified at about 11,600 kg, with a range of about 1,000 km. The prototype Saab 90 (Scandia) first flew in November 1946. It was capable of seating 24–32 passengers, with low-speed capability. It was to be fitted with Pratt & Whitney R-2000 engines. It had a single nosewheel and fully retractable landing gear. ABA Swedish Airlines, a predecessor of SAS, ordered 11 examples. The Type certificate was issued in June 1950. Delivery started in October 1950 but, after testing, specification had changed to the Pratt & Whitney R-2180-E Twin Wasp E. Two Brazilian airlines (VASP and Aerovias do Brasil) also ordered a total of six aircraft. The prototype was subsequently converted to a luxury private executive aircraft for the Brazilian industrialist Olavo Fontoura.

Design
The Scandia project was initiated in 1944 by a supposed need (after World War II) for an aircraft carrying 25–30 passengers for a distance of up to 1000 km.

Main design objectives were: safety; two engines; long life; economic operation.

The wing was shaped, using NACA profiles, to provide good stalling characteristics. Low wing design was chosen since it provided:
 Less structural weight
 Better safety in an emergency landing
 Possibility for one continuous flap

The wing was built in three pieces. The centre section with engine mounts, and left and right sections which were bolted to the centre section, immediately outboard of the engine nacelles.

The fuselage diameter was chosen to allow for four seats per row. This configuration gave a capacity of 32 passengers. A configuration with wider and more comfortable seats, three seats per row, carrying a total of 24 passengers was also offered. The prototype (90.001) was equipped with  Pratt & Whitney Twin Wasp R2000 engines (changed to  P&W Twin Wasp R2180 on the production version).

The entire aircraft was built of metal except for the rudders which were fabric-covered metal frames.

Test flights
The prototype (SE-BCA) made its first flight on November 16, 1946. Claes Smith was the pilot. The first flight lasted for 20 minutes. The plane had exceptionally good slow-flying characteristics, with full control down to 110–115 km/h. The stall was slow and preceded by vibrations. The plane also turned out to be easily maneuvered with one engine shut down, which at the time was typically not the case with twin-engined aircraft. Unfortunately the rudder harmony was not satisfactory, with high control forces in some situations. The engine installation also needed redesign.

The prototype flew a total of 154 hours before the winter of 1947/48 when it was parked in the hangar for modifications. The engines were elevated for increased clearance between propeller blades and ground. The cabin, which previously contained only test equipment, was furnished. On February 7, 1948, the prototype took off again and began the second testing phase. The second phase consisted of mainly performance tests. After 700 hours of test flying it was decided to introduce the following changes to the production planes:
More powerful engines
Four-blade Hamilton-Standard propellers
Spring tabs on rudder and elevators for reduced control forces

Operational history

The first production Scandias were delivered in 1950.  SAS received its eight aircraft between October 1950 and October 1954.  SAS initially operated its Scandias on intra-Scandinavian flights. Scheduled services by Scandias were operated also to European cities including Amsterdam, Brussels and London Airport (Heathrow) between 1951 and 1955. Until Scandias were withdrawn in 1957 they also served in a modest first class configuration  on the new route from Scandinavia to Moscow via Riga.

VASP operated its fleet of new and ex-SAS Scandias on intra-Brazilian scheduled flights between October 1950 and late 1966.

The Swedish Air Force put heavy and insistent demands upon the SAAB factory, for the Saab 29 fighter aircraft, which spelled the end of the Scandia project in Sweden, with residual production being undertaken by Fokker, in the Netherlands.

Altogether, only 18 examples were manufactured. The entire SAS fleet was eventually purchased by VASP, in 1957.

A larger version with pressurised cabin called 90B was planned, but never built.

The last flight with a 90 Scandia was on July 22, 1969. The sole surviving Scandia is the 16th built, ex VASP PP-SQR, which is preserved in deteriorating condition by a museum at  Bebedouro in the state of São Paulo, Brazil.

Variants
Saab 90A
 Twin-engined short-range airliner. Main production version.
Saab 90B
 Proposed version. Not built.

Operators

 
 VASP
 ,  and 
 Scandinavian Airlines System (SAS)
 
 Aktiebolaget Aerotransport (ABA)

Accidents and incidents
Three VASP Scandias were lost in fatal crashes with a further two written off in non-fatal accidents.

December 30, 1958: a VASP Saab Scandia 90A-1 registration PP-SQE flying from Rio de Janeiro-Santos Dumont to São Paulo-Congonhas during climb after takeoff had a failure on engine no. 1. The pilot initiated procedures to return to the airport but during the second turn the aircraft stalled and crashed into Guanabara Bay. Of the 34 passengers and crew aboard, 20 died.
September 23, 1959: a VASP Saab Scandia 90A-1 registration PP-SQV en route from São Paulo-Congonhas to Rio de Janeiro-Santos Dumont during climb after takeoff did not gain enough height and crashed  minutes out of São Paulo, killing all 20 passengers and crew.
November 26, 1962: a VASP Saab Scandia 90A-1 registration PP-SRA en route from São Paulo-Congonhas to Rio de Janeiro-Santos Dumont collided in the air over the Municipality of Paraibuna, State of São Paulo with a private Cessna 310, registration PT-BRQ, en route from Rio de Janeiro-Santos Dumont to São Paulo-Campo de Marte. Both were flying on the same airway AB-6 in opposite directions and failed to make visual contact. Both aircraft crashed, killing all 23 passengers and crew of the Saab and all four occupants of the Cessna.

Surviving aircraft

As of 2007, only one 90 Scandia, PP-SQR, remains. It stands outdoors in at the Museu de Armas, Veículos e Máquinas Eduardo André Matarazzo in Bebedouro, Brazil.

Specifications

See also

References

External links

 MyAviation.net photo gallery

1940s Swedish airliners
Swedish civil aircraft
Saab aircraft
Aircraft first flown in 1946
Low-wing aircraft
Twin piston-engined tractor aircraft